Widnall is a surname. Notable people with the surname include:

Sheila Widnall (born 1938), American aerospace researcher and Institute Professor at the Massachusetts Institute of Technology
William B. Widnall (1906–1983), member of the United States House of Representatives for 24 years representing the 7th district of New Jersey